Alan Richard Watson (9 July 1929 – 15 February 2007) was a British rower. He competed in the men's eight event at the 1956 Summer Olympics.

He also represented England and won a silver medal in the eights at the 1954 British Empire and Commonwealth Games in Vancouver, Canada. He was a member of the Thames Rowing Club.

References

External links
 
 

1929 births
2007 deaths
British male rowers
Olympic rowers of Great Britain
Rowers at the 1956 Summer Olympics
Rowers from Greater London
Commonwealth Games medallists in rowing
Rowers at the 1954 British Empire and Commonwealth Games
Commonwealth Games silver medallists for England
Medallists at the 1954 British Empire and Commonwealth Games